Back to Earth is the eleventh studio album released by the British singer/songwriter Cat Stevens. It is the only album he recorded using the name Cat Stevens after his conversion to Islam until the release in September 2017 of The Laughing Apple, his fifteenth studio album (credited to "Yusuf / Cat Stevens"). It was also the last album of contemporary Western music that he recorded until An Other Cup, 28 years later.

Background 
On 8 December 1977 Stevens was awarded the "Sun Peace Award" by the Symphony for the United Nations in New York City. On 23 December 1977 Stevens entered the Regent's Park Mosque in London and formally embraced Islam.

On 4 July 1978, Steven Georgiou changed his name to Yusuf Islam. Although he wanted to retire from popular music after his religious conversion, Islam owed his record company Island/A&M one more "Cat Stevens" album under his recording contract.

Yusuf recorded this album in November 1978, re-uniting with his producer from the early 1970s, Paul Samwell-Smith, and arranger Del Newman, which includes his guitarist, Alun Davies, also his drummer Gerry Conway, neither of whom had appeared on Stevens' previous 1977 album "Izitso". Alun co–wrote two new songs. The old team had now come back together to complete the final record. Recorded in several places including Sweet Silence Studios in Copenhagen, Long View Farm in Massachusetts, Advision Studios in London, and CBS in New York City, the album was completed at Le Studio in Quebec.

At this point, Yusuf was praying five times daily and the sessions took on a melancholy edge, as it was implicitly understood that they were to be the last. On 3 December 1978, the album Back to Earth was released. The same day the album was released, Yusuf's father Stavros Georgiou died. As he was unwilling to promote the album Back to Earth with a tour, it peaked at only No. 33 on the Billboard charts, and its singles "Bad Brakes", and "Randy" made a poor showing in the charts. The UK single release, "Last Love Song", released on Island in February 1979, similarly failed to chart. All three singles were backed with the instrumental "Nascimento". It would be the singer's last album for 28 years, until An Other Cup was released in 2006.

Back to Earth features a return to the acoustic guitar sound of Stevens' early 1970s albums like Tea for the Tillerman. Two of the songs, "Just Another Night" and "Last Love Song", express bitterness about how he was treated by the music industry, with lyrics such as "If you don't want me, maybe I don't want you." However, in the song Never, Stevens hints that he may return to music someday, "There's going to be another time; there's going to be another moment."  Eventually, he would return to popular music.

Island Records no longer control copyrights to post-1974 catalogue of Cat Stevens albums he recorded for Island, including Back to Earth. They're nowadays owned by Yusuf Islam himself through Cat-O-Log Records label.

Track listing 
All songs by Cat Stevens, except where noted:

Side one 
 "Just Another Night" – 3:49
 "Daytime" (Stevens, Alun Davies) – 3:55
 "Bad Brakes" (Stevens, Davies) – 3:27
 "Randy" – 3:12
 "The Artist" [instrumental] – 2:32

Side two 
 "Last Love Song" – 3:27
 "Nascimento" [instrumental] – 3:16
 "Father" – 4:08
 "New York Times" – 3:24
 "Never" – 3:01

Personnel 
 Cat Stevens – electric guitar, acoustic guitar, steel guitar, lead guitar, piano, electric piano, Hammond organ, ARP String Synthesizer, harmonica, bass, vocals, backing vocals
 Gerry Conway - drums, percussion
 Alun Davies – electric guitar, acoustic guitar, classical guitar, rhythm guitar
 Brian Cole – steel guitar on "Just Another Night"
 Eric Johnson – electric guitar on "Bad Brakes"
 Jean Roussel – piano, electric piano, organ, hammond organ, synthesizer, brass, strings, arrangements
 Bruce Lynch – double bass, bass
 Will Lee – bass on "New York Times"
 Graham Smith – harmonica on "Bad Brakes"
 John Marson – harp on "Daytime"
 Steve Jordan – drums, percussion on "The Artist" and "New York Times"
 Don Weller – saxophone on "Nascimento"
 Tower of Power – horns on "Nascimento"
 Paul Samwell-Smith – backing vocals on "Daytime" and "Last Love Song"
 The McCrarys – backing vocals on "New York Times"
 Luther Vandross – backing vocals on "New York Times"
 Milton Nascimento - vocals on "Nascimento"

Charts

References 

1978 albums
Cat Stevens albums
Albums produced by Paul Samwell-Smith
Island Records albums
A&M Records albums